Cransac is a commune in the Aveyron department in southern France. Cransac station has rail connections to Brive-la-Gaillarde, Figeac and Rodez.

The town was a coal-mining centre until the mine closed in 1962. Cransac has mineral springs, known in the middle ages. There are iron-mines in the neighbourhood. Hills to the north of the town contain disused coal-mines which have been on fire for centuries. About  to the south is the fine Renaissance château of Bournazel, built for the most part by Jean de Buisson, baron of Bournazel, about 1545. The barony of Bournazel became a marquisate in 1624.

Population

See also
Communes of the Aveyron department

References

Communes of Aveyron
Aveyron communes articles needing translation from French Wikipedia